Robillard is a surname of French origin. It is not uncommon in Canada and is known in certain areas of the United States, especially New England. Variations of the name include Rabior, Rebeor and Rubeor.

Notable people with the name include:

Alexander Robillard (1843-1907), Canadian politician
Anne Robillard (born 1955), Canadian novelist
Charlotte Robillard-Millette (born 1999), Canadian tennis player
Clément Robillard (1850-1926), Canadian politician
Duke Robillard (born 1948), blues guitarist and singer
Gene Robillard (1929-2007), Canadian football player
Harry Edward de Robillard Wetherall (1889-1979), British army general
Honoré Robillard (1835-1914), Canadian politician, brother of Alexander
Hyacinthe Robillard d'Avrigny, (1675-1719), French Jesuit historian of religion
Jean Robillard, Canadian medical doctor and academic
Joseph Robillard (1839-1905), Quebec politician
Lucienne Robillard (born 1945), Canadian politician
Marc Robillard (born 1974), Canadian musician
Melanie Robillard (born 1982), Canadian curler
Ulysse-Janvier Robillard (1826-1900), Quebec politician
Yves Robillard (born 1942), Canadian politician

See also
 Robillard (disambiguation)

References 

French-language surnames